"Highschool Hoodlums" was released as a promotional single for The Datsuns' fourth album, Head Stunts. It was released on vinyl at their live shows in their New Zealand tour during March 2008.

The song reached number 1 on the KiwiFM top 10 within days of its release.

It is featured in the 2010 Miracle Whip commercial.

References

The news section states the vinyl is released at the NZ shows.
KiwiFM

2008 singles
The Datsuns songs
2008 songs